Tor Svendsberget (born 3 November 1947) is a former Norwegian biathlete.

Life and career
He received a silver medal in 20 km at the 1970 Biathlon World Championships in Östersund, and bronze medals in Lake Placid 1973 and in Minsk 1974.

He has received four silver medals and one bronze medal in 4 × 7.5 km relay in the Biathlon World Championships with the Norwegian team. Svendsberget became junior world champion in 1967 and 1968.

Ahead of the 1979–80 season, Svendsberget was not reselected for the Norwegian national biathlon team. As a consequence, Svendsberget retired from the sport.

Biathlon results
All results are sourced from the International Biathlon Union.

Olympic Games

World Championships
8 medals (5 silver, 3 bronze)

*During Olympic seasons competitions are only held for those events not included in the Olympic program.
**Sprint was added as an event in 1974.

References

External links
 

1947 births
Living people
Norwegian male biathletes
Biathletes at the 1972 Winter Olympics
Biathletes at the 1976 Winter Olympics
Olympic biathletes of Norway
Biathlon World Championships medalists